The AMD Spider platform consists of enthusiast level products from AMD, including AMD Phenom X4 9000 series processors, ATI Radeon HD 3800 series GPUs, and the AMD 7 series chipset.

See also
 AMD Dragon
 Phenom (processor)
 Radeon R600
 AMD 700 chipset series

References

 
 

AMD platforms